UFC Fight Night: Edgar vs. Swanson (also known as UFC Fight Night 57) was a mixed martial arts event held at the Frank Erwin Center in Austin, Texas, on November 22, 2014.

Background
The event was the second that the organization had hosted in Austin, following UFC Fight Night 22 in 2010.

The card was headlined by a Featherweight bout between Cub Swanson and Frankie Edgar.

A bout between Paige VanZant and Kailin Curran, briefly linked to UFC Fight Night: MacDonald vs. Saffiedine, was rescheduled after VanZant suffered a minor injury and took place at this event.

Results

Bonus awards
The following fighters were awarded $50,000 bonuses:

Fight of the Night: Paige VanZant vs. Kailin Curran
Performance of the Night: Frankie Edgar and Aleksei Oleinik

See also
List of UFC events
2014 in UFC

References

UFC Fight Night
Mixed martial arts in Texas
Sports in Austin, Texas
2014 in mixed martial arts